Suxian District is one of two urban districts in the prefecture-level city of Chenzhou, Hunan province, China.

The district is located in the northeastern part of the city proper. It is bordered to the north by Yongxing County, to the northeast by Zixing City, to the southeast by Yizhang County, to the southwest by Beihu District, to the west by Guiyang County. The district has six subdistricts and eight towns under its jurisdiction. the government seat is Suxianling Subdistrict.

Attractions
Gaoyi Ridge is a famous scenic spot in the district.

Administrative divisions
6 subdistricts
 Bailudong
 Guanshandong
 Nanta
 Puliping
 Suxianling
 Wangxianling

8 towns
 Aoshang
 Bailutang
 Feitianshan
 Liangtian
 Qifengdu
 Wugaishan
 Wulipai
 Xujiadong

References
www.xzqh.org 

 
County-level divisions of Hunan
Geography of Chenzhou